is a Japanese light novel series written by Ishio Yamagata and illustrated by Shigeki Maeshima. The series started with the release of the first volume on September 22, 2005, and by January 22, 2010, ten volumes had been published by Shueisha under its Super Dash Bunko label. A manga adaptation by Kokonotsu Shinohara was serialized in Shueisha's Internet-based manga magazine Ultra Jump Egg between March 2008 and October 2009. An anime adaptation, The Book of Bantorra began airing in Japan on October 2, 2009. In 2012, the anime series was licensed for distribution in North America by Sentai Filmworks.

Plot
In a world where deceased people turn into stone-like books that are stored in the labyrinthine Bantorra Library, anyone who touches such a book can glean into the past, observing the life of the person who died to create it. The Bantorra Library is maintained by the Armed Librarians, who are trained in combat and wield supernatural abilities. Their operations are overseen by the library's acting director, Hamyuts Meseta, a hardened killer herself. Their enemy is a globally active cult known as the Shindeki Church, led by the so-called True Men, who hold the fulfillment of their personal desires above all else. The story does not feature an obvious main protagonist, instead following a large number of characters, primarily members of the Armed Librarians. Beginning with their assault on a ship owned by the Shindeki Church carrying brainwashed slaves implanted with explosives, Tatakau Shisho chronicles the ongoing conflict between the members of the Bantorra Library and their enemies, alongside the fates of the various characters involved in it, past and present.

Characters

Bantorra Library

The acting director of the Bantorra Library. She usually wears a white button-down shirt with a small bunny patch sewn on the right breast. She has an easy-going personality and a lust for battle; she is always searching for an opponent strong enough to kill her. She had a relationship with Mattalast in the past. Her main weapon is a sling (usually wrapped around her right wrist), which she uses to snipe enemies from a far distance with great precision and force. She can throw large objects, but usually uses small rocks or pebbles. The speed of those projectiles can reach five times the speed of sound. Her magic ability is "Sensory Fibres", which allows her to observe locations from afar. Her fibres, fully emitted, can reach approximately 50 kilometers, while the number of fibres emitted reaches over billions. According to Minth's Sacred Eyes ability, her main trait is self-loathing, her thoughts are void, and she wishes for love.

 First grade Armed Librarian, and one of the five strongest Armed Librarians. He usually wears a black tuxedo and bowler hat. He is an easy-going person and always known by people as a liar. He used to have a relationship with Hamyuts. His main weapons are guns. He bears a revolver and an anti-tank rifle. His magic ability is to see two seconds ahead in the future, which he can use to preemptively take action in the presence of the enemy. He is one of the few who knows the secret of Heaven and also protects it.

 Third grade Armed Librarian and is the instructor of Noloty. She was once a reserve officer of The Empire and was introduced by Hamyuts Meseta to join the Armed Librarians. She usually wears her uniform and is a strict person. Her main weapons are a sword and pistol. Due to her lack of combat proficiency she usually takes on a support role. Her magic ability is Telepathy; regardless of how far away a person is located, she can engage in telepathic communication with them-- as long as she knows their name and appearance. She is in love with Volken.

 A man in his early 20s. He always wears traditional Armed Librarian robes. He is very proud of being an Armed Librarian, and holds both himself and others to high standards. He is the adopted son of previous Acting Director Fhotona, who he loves and respects. His magic right, which he was born with, is the creation of illusions that take the form he decides; this ability is signified by his green hair. While using an illusion of himself as a distraction, he can attack with his personal weapons, iron rings with two blades built into them. These are referred to as "Macmani's Dancing Blades" because of how they dance and spin through the air. He can also walk or stand on them in mid-air, a tactic which requires great agility. Though he is only a third grade armed librarian, he is very skilled and could easily make his way to the top. However, when he discovered Hamyuts was the one who sank the Silver Smoke in Aro bay, his strong sense of justice drove him to rebel against her.
 Volken believed the Armed Librarians existed for the sake of justice. When he discovered that the Shindeki Church was a branch of the Armed Librarians, and that Fhotona, who taught him the importance of justice, also knew about it, he was paralyzed by shock. In that moment, Hamyuts was able to catch him off-guard and kill him. During the final battle in Ruruta's non-entity entrails, Hamyuts uses her "Book Eating" power, summoning Volken to fight alongside the others.

 A trainee Armed Librarian. She is an expert in hand-to-hand combat. She is a joyful, outgoing person who doesn't like to kill people. She was born on an island near The Empire and raised by her father, who was the head of the village. After her father died, she was thrown out of the village, and eventually became an Armed Librarian.

 The Director and founder of the Bantorra Library. His ability is "Tearless Ending", which causes snow to fall across the entire planet, putting humanity into an eternal slumber. Like Zatoh Rondohoon, he is a Book Eater, but his resolve allowed him to consume significantly more books (100,000).

 One of the strongest Armed Librarians, along with Hamyuts Meseta. He is a lonely man who is so strong that he fears his own power. During a war between the Bantorra Library and The Empire, he felt guilty after killing so many people, therefore he locked himself deep in the labyrinth beneath Bantorra Library. His magic ability is to control armies of flesh-consuming ants.

 The oldest Armed Librarian, and one of the five strongest, her job is to instruct trainee Armed Librarians. Her kind and friendly personality has earned the trust and love of most of the Armed Librarians. She mainly fights hand-to-hand. She has tremendous strength, which she uses to lift large and heavy objects easily. Her magic ability is localized time control. Objects must be within her line of sight for it to be affected by her magic. She can also stop time for herself, making her invincible though while in this state she cannot move.

 A childhood friend of Hamyuts. She is also known as "The Violet Sinner". Her ability is "Soul Transference", an ability that is similar to Mirepoc's telepathy but of higher level, as it can control the minds of people by injecting part of her soul.

 The previous Acting Director who served directly before Hamyuts. He was a mentor to Volken. As Hamyuts rises through the ranks of the Armed Librarians, he orders Mattalast to murder her while the two of them are on a mission to kill Hiza the traitor. He fears she will become too powerful, far surpassing everyone in the library.

 The Acting Director of Bantorra Library who served three terms before Hamyuts Meseta. After being asked by "Heaven" (Ruruta Coozancoona) to find a way to kill him, Makia created Chacoly and Hamyuts for that purpose. He seemed very emotionally troubled by his own actions afterward, and died as an old man doing harsh physical labor to punish himself.

 / 
 (Enlike Bishile)
 (Zatoh Rondohoon)
The original Enlike Bishile was a young Meat who was led into the false belief that killing others would make him happy, on a transport ship, he catches the attention of Ganbanzel and is chosen when he learns that he has a strong desire to smile once more. Zatoh Rondohoon is a Book Eater, who absorbed Enlike's book. Unlike many others, Enlike's soul managed to take control of Zatoh's body for an extended period and used this as a chance to emerge and put an end to Zatoh's control of the body.

Shindeki Church

 The leader of the Shindeki Church, known as the Governor of Paradise. His magic ability is to bend light and he uses this to hide his face. It is revealed by Hamyuts that the Governor of Paradise is chosen from among the ranks of the Armed Librarians and that the Church and the Armed Librarians act that they fight each other, but in truth they are working alongside each other in protecting a secret. This secret is passed from Acting Director to Acting Director. Hamyuts and Kachua must protect this secret of Heaven.

 Known as "The Ever-Laughing Witch", and was a girl who lived in the Ronar Dukedom, an era three centuries before the current timeline. She was the person who found the cure for Dragon Pneumonia, a deadly and highly contagious disease. She has the ability to look far into the future. It is because of this ability that she fell in love with Colio Tonies who was born three centuries after her. She wields the laughing demon sword Shlamuffen, bestowed by the King (who believes it is a weapon worthy of the country's savior), and is thus idolized as the nation's "ever-laughing saint".

Meats

 A Meat, who doesn't consider himself human, and has been implanted with a bomb and sent out by the Shindeki Church to kill Hamyuts Meseta. His story focuses on the collection of various fragments of a book depicting the tragic tale of a young woman named Shiron Byacornise, possessing the ability to see the future, and the love story enfolding between them, crossing even the boundaries of time.

 / 

The original Olivia Litlet was a young Meat, shown to have more clout and leadership among the others, with an agenda of their own. However, Renas Fluru is Mokkania's mother who had died twenty years ago. Due to Olivia's resemblance to Renas, she was later used by Winkeny Bize and had Renas's memories implanted in her, so as to have her assume the identity of Mokkania's mother, taking over Renas's body. Although later, Olivia regained control of her body with Renas's personality a little voice in the back of her mind.

He is a plump sorcerer who holds a high position in the organization and the magic ability of short-range telekinesis. He is in love with Olivia Litlet and keeps her by his side. For that, he is demoted to a Meat as punishment for his mismanagement. He died protecting her.

War Machines of the Past
Shlamuffen
The Ever-Laughing Demon Sword used by Shiron Byacornise (thus her title, Ever-Laughing Witch) that can counter any attacks. It does seem to have its own consciousness to the point it would relentlessly attack a target of its own choosing even without the command of its wielder.

Argax
The Fantasy Slaughtering Cup that has the power to selectively erase the drinker's memories.

Yluculucu
Also referred to as the Spinning or Dancing Fairy, reflecting its appearance. Yluculucu is used as a container for magic rights, which are stored when people undergo Magical Deliberation within its vicinity. Depending on its user, it can be the weakest or the strongest war machine.

Yor
Also known as the Stone Sword of Spent Time, this sword has the power to remove and gather books from those who have died. Yor's physical manifestation is known as Lascall Othello, which initially appears to be an old gentleman, but later takes on the form of a young girl.

Deities
Bantorra
The God of the Past, who represents the records of all humanity, having created the Bantorra Library and the monsters that guard its lower labyrinths.
Towitorra
The God of the Present, who represents the maintenance of the laws of physics.

Orntorra
The God of the Future, whose role is to guide humans to a better direction, by sending seven angels with the seven War Machines of the Past to destroy the era of the Age of Paradise.

Media

Light novel

Manga

Chapter list

Anime

Episode list

Music
The composer for the series is Yoshihisa Hirano.

Opening themes
  by Ali Project (Episodes 1-16).
  by Sasaki Sayaka (Episodes 17-27).

Closing themes
 "Light of Dawn" by Annabel (Episodes 1-16).
 "Dominant Space" by Aira Yuhki (Episodes 17-27)

References

External links
Anime official website 

2005 Japanese novels
2008 manga
Adventure anime and manga
Anime and manga based on light novels
David Production
Fantasy anime and manga
Light novels
NBCUniversal Entertainment Japan
Seinen manga
Sentai Filmworks
Shueisha franchises
Shueisha manga
Super Dash Bunko
Television shows written by Mari Okada